Alice Stevens or Stephens may refer to:

Alice Stevens (The Walking Dead)
Alice Barber Stephens (1858–1932), American painter and engraver